Haustoriidae is a family of amphipods. They are very distinctive stout-bodied burrowing animals.

The following genera are included in the family:
Acanthohaustorius Bousfield, 1965
Cunicus
Eohaustorius J. L. Barnard, 1957
Haustorius P. L. St. Muller, 1775
Lepidactylus Say, 1818
Neohaustorius Bousfield, 1965
Parahaustorius Bousfield, 1971
Protohaustorius Bonsfield, 1965
Pseudohaustorius Bousfield, 1965

References

Gammaridea
Taxa named by Thomas Roscoe Rede Stebbing
Crustacean families